Don't You Forget About Me may refer to:

 "Don't You (Forget About Me)", a 1985 song by Simple Minds
 Don't You Forget About Me (novel), a 2007 novel in Cecily von Ziegesar's Gossip Girl series
 Don't You Forget About Me (film), a 2009 Canadian documentary film about John Hughes